Mechanically separated meat (MSM), mechanically recovered/reclaimed meat (MRM), or mechanically deboned meat (MDM) is a paste-like meat product produced by forcing pureed or ground beef, pork, mutton, turkey or chicken, under high pressure through a sieve or similar device to separate the bone from the edible meat tissue. It is sometimes called white slime as an analog to meat-additive pink slime and to meat extracted by advanced meat recovery systems, both of which are different processes. The process entails pureeing or grinding the carcass left after the manual removal of meat from the bones and then forcing the slurry through a sieve under pressure. This puree includes bone, bone marrow, skin, nerves, blood vessels, and the scraps of meat remaining on the bones.

The resulting product is a blend primarily consisting of tissues not generally considered meat along with a much smaller amount of actual meat (muscle tissue). In some countries such as the United States, these non-meat materials are processed separately for human and non-human uses and consumption. The process is controversial; Forbes, for example, called it a "not-so-appetizing meat production process".

Mechanically separated meat has been used in certain meat and meat products, such as hot dogs and bologna sausage, since the late 1960s. However, not all such meat products are manufactured using an MSM process.

History 

The practice of mechanically compiling leftover meat scraps dates to the 1950s when hand tools were developed to help remove the remaining pieces of meat and fascia from animal carcasses to minimize waste. Primarily MSM was developed and produced in countries whose agriculture was human conducted and because of it likely were unable to provide mass quantities of regularly processed meat for widespread and affordable consumption. By the 1960s, machines changed from manual operation to automatic operation. This change allowed meat company owners to use meat scraps and sell them to people for a price lower than the price of normal cut meat. During the 1970s these techniques became more common in other parts of the world as well. In addition to poultry slaughterhouses being new to the market, other newcomers recognized the financial gains mechanically separated meat processing provided. Eastern European countries, especially, are known for their import of frozen chicken MSM.

In the 1950s mechanically separated meat was mostly used as a raw material for the production of hot dogs. Currently, luncheon meats, burgers, and mortadella are regularly made from MSM.

Safety and regulation 

In the United States, mechanically separated poultry has been used in poultry products since 1969, after the National Academy of Sciences found it safe. Questions about safety arose in the 1980s, leading to a 1982 report by the U.S. Food Safety and Inspection Service (FSIS) which concluded that mechanically separated meat is safe and established a standard of identity. Some restrictions were put in place, however, to limit intake of certain components, such as calcium, which are higher in mechanically separated meat than in other meat products. These affect what types of products which can contain mechanically separated meat, as well as how much. For example, hot dogs may contain mechanically separated pork, but no more than 20% of the final product. Additionally, ingredient lists must label mechanically separated meats as such.

In 1996 a final rule, published by the Food Safety and Inspection Service of the U.S. Department of Agriculture in the Federal Register (see 60 FR 55962), took effect. It stated that mechanically separated poultry must be labeled, but is safe to use without restriction. Significant restrictions were, however, placed on mechanically separated beef due to concerns about bovine spongiform encephalopathy (BSE), commonly known as "mad cow disease". Ultimately, products with mechanically separated beef were prohibited for human consumption:

Concerns over BSE first arose, however, in 1986 in the United Kingdom. Since mechanically separated beef often contained small amounts of spinal cord tissue, which can carry the BSE prion, consuming mechanically separated meat from bovine carcasses carried an increased risk of transmitting BSE to humans. The United Kingdom tightened restrictions multiple times starting in 1989, to decrease the risk of spinal cord tissue getting into mechanically separated bovine meat. In the mid-1990s the UK banned mechanically separated meat from cattle backbone, which was expanded to include backbone from any ruminant in 1998, and any ruminant bone in 2001. Since then, the sale of any mechanically separated beef for human consumption has been prohibited.

See also 

 Specified risk material (SRM)
 Potted meat food product
 Lena Groeger: science journalist who compared meat textures generated by different mechanical procedures

References

External links 
 Snopes.com MSP discussion

Meat industry
Intensive farming